Yoshi is a fictional character from the Mario video game franchise.

Yoshi may also refer to:

People 
 Yoshi Katō (1913–1988), Japanese actor
 Yoshi Sodeoka, American artist and musician
 Yoshi Sudarso (born 1989), American actor, model and stuntman
 Yoshi Tatsu (born 1977), ring name of Japanese pro-wrestler Naofumi Yamamoto
 Yoshi Wada (1943–2021), Japanese-American musician
 Ikuzo Yoshi (born 1952), Japanese singer
 Y. Misdaq, aka Yoshi, British musician and multimedia artist
 Hitomi Yoshizawa (born 1985), nicknamed Yoshi or Yossie, Japanese idol, Morning Musume member
 Naoki Yoshida (born 1973), aka Yoshi-P, Japanese video game producer, director and designer working for Square-Enix

Fictional characters
 Yoshi, in The Adventures of Dr. McNinja
 Yoshi (Bleach), in the Bleach anime series
 Yoshino Fujieda, in the anime series Digimon Data Squad who is nicknamed "Yoshi" in the dub
 Hamato Yoshi, in the Teenage Mutant Ninja Turtles universe
 Yosshii, in the anime series Don't Toy with Me, Miss Nagatoro who is nicknamed Yoshi in the dubbed version

Other uses
 Yoshi (mammal), a prehistoric genus of sabertooth cats
 Yoshi (franchise), a video game franchise
 Yoshi (video game), a 1991 video game
 Yoshi (crater), a small lunar crater
 Yoshi's, two jazz clubs, in Oakland and San Francisco, California

See also
 Yoshii (disambiguation)

Japanese unisex given names
Hypocorisms
Lists of people by nickname